Pollokshaws East railway station is a railway station in Glasgow, Scotland, serving parts of the Pollokshaws, Auldhouse, Newlands and Shawlands neighbourhoods of the city. The station is managed by ScotRail and is located on the Cathcart Circle Line.

History 
The Caledonian Railway extended the original Cathcart District Railway route back in a loop configuration towards Glasgow Central in 1894, opening the station here along with it on 2 April that year.  The station had a goods yard on the north side of the line to the east of station (on the other side of Kilmarnock Road. This was served by a signal box on the south side of the line, opposite the yard. The signal box was closed on 16 October 1961 as part of the electrification scheme.

British Rail demolished the station building, replacing it with a shelter in the late 1980s. In 2006, housing was built on the site of the goods yard.

Services

Up to November 1979 
Two trains per hour between Glasgow Central and Kirkhill and one train per hour in each direction on the Cathcart Circle (Inner and Outer).

From November 1979 
Following the opening of the Argyle Line on 5 November 1979, two trains per hour between Glasgow Central and Kirkhill and two trains per hour in each direction on the Cathcart Circle (Inner and Outer).

From 2006 
One train per hour between Glasgow Central and Newton via Kirkhill and one train per hour in each direction on the Cathcart Circle (Inner and Outer).  On Sundays, there is an hourly service to/from Newton only.

Routes

References

Notes

Sources 

 
 
 
 

Railway stations in Glasgow
Former Caledonian Railway stations
Railway stations in Great Britain opened in 1894
SPT railway stations
Railway stations served by ScotRail
Pollokshaws